Amir Dizaj (also romanized as Amīr Dīzaj and Amīrdīzaj; also known as Ālā Kūzeh and Ālāgūzeh) is a village in Qebleh Daghi Rural District, Howmeh District, Azarshahr County, East Azerbaijan Province, Iran. At the 2006 census, its population was 1,018, in 188 families.

References 

Populated places in Azarshahr County